Roze's worm lizard (Amphisbaena rozei) is a species of amphisbaenian in the family Amphisbaenidae. The species is endemic to Venezuela.

Etymology
The specific name, rozei, is in honor of Latvian-born American herpetologist Janis Roze.

Geographic range
A. rozei is found in Bolívar state, Venezuela.

Habitat
The preferred habitat of A. rozei is forest.

Description
A. rozei has four precloacal pores. The dorsal surface of the tail is covered by strong tubercles.

Reproduction
A. rozei is oviparous.

References

Further reading
Costa HC, Señaris JC, Rojas-Runjaic FJM, Zaher H, Garcia PCA (2018). "Redescription of the rare South American worm lizard Amphisbaena rozei (Squamata: Amphisbaenidae)". Amphibia-Reptilia 39 (1): 21–30.
Gans C (2005). "Checklist and Bibliography of the Amphisbaenia of the World". Bulletin of the American Museum of Natural History (289): 1–130. (Amphisbaena rozei, p. 19).
Lancini AR (1963). "Una nueva espécie del género Amphisbaena (Sauria: Amphisbaenidae) de Venezuela ". Publicaciones Ocasionales del Museo de Ciencias Naturales de Caracas, Zoología 6: 1–3. (Amphisbaena rozei, new species). (in Spanish).
Vanzolini PE (2002). "An aid to the identification of South American species of Amphisbaena (Squamata, Amphisbaenidae)". Papéis Avulsos de Zoologia, Museu de Zoologia da Universidade de São Paulo 42 (15): 351–362.

Amphisbaena (lizard)
Reptiles described in 1963
Taxa named by Abdem Ramón Lancini Villalaz
Endemic fauna of Venezuela
Reptiles of Venezuela